Amblyseius italicus is a species of mite in the family Phytoseiidae.

References

italicus
Articles created by Qbugbot
Animals described in 1959